Sir Chris Ham  (born 15 May 1951), is a health policy academic who started life as a political scientist.  He was chief executive of the King's Fund from 2010 to 2018.  He was professor of health policy and management at University of Birmingham's health services management centre from 1992 to 2010. He was seconded to the Department of Health where he was Director of the Strategy Unit working with Alan Milburn and John Reid until 2004.

He was said to be "unrivalled in his ability to distil and synthesise complex policy developments and present them in a clear and digestible manner for non-specialists" in 1999. He is frequently called upon to chair large conferences on health policy in England.

He was said by the Health Service Journal to be the 38th most powerful person in the English NHS in December 2013.

In the June 2018 Birthday Honours he was appointed a CBE for his services.

He was appointed as independent chair of the Coventry and Warwickshire sustainability and transformation partnership in January 2019.  He is also Co-Chair of the NHS Assembly and a non-executive director of the Royal Free London NHS Foundation Trust.

Publications
Working together for Health: achievements and challenges in the Kaiser NHS Beacon Sites Programme, 2010
Transforming the Delivery of Health and Social Care: The Case for Fundamental Change with Anna Dixon and Beatrice Brooke, 2012
Commissioning integrated care in a liberated NHS, 2011
Health policy in Britain (6 Editions)
The Politics of NHS Reform, 1988-97: Metaphor or Reality?, 2000
Management and Competition in the NHS, 1997
The Policy Process in the Modern Capitalist State, with Michael Hill (Jan 1993)

References

External links
 Kings Fund

1951 births
British political scientists
National Health Service people
Living people
Academics of the University of Birmingham
Alumni of the University of Kent
Commanders of the Order of the British Empire
Deputy Lieutenants of the West Midlands (county)